Mukhtar Hussain (born 11 January 1999) is an Indian cricketer. He made his List A debut for Assam in the 2017–18 Vijay Hazare Trophy on 13 February 2018. He made his first-class debut for Assam in the 2018–19 Ranji Trophy on 1 November 2018. He was the leading wicket-taker for Assam in the tournament, with 40 dismissals in nine matches. He made his Twenty20 debut for Assam in the 2018–19 Syed Mushtaq Ali Trophy on 21 February 2019.

References

External links
 

1999 births
Living people
Indian cricketers
Assam cricketers
Cricketers from Assam